Eddleston railway station served the village of Eddleston, Scottish Borders, Scotland from 1855 to 1962 on the Peebles Railway.

History 
The station opened on 4 July 1855 by the Peebles Railway. It was situated on the west side of Station Road. Initially, it had one platform but another was built along with a passing loop in the 1890s. The goods yard was small, behind the up platform and had two sidings one serving a dock. A camping coach was noticed standing in the goods yard in the 1930s. By this time, the down platform was taken out of use, the passing loop was lifted and the signal box was demolished. The station still remained open to passengers and goods traffic until the closure of the line on 5 February 1962.

References

External links 

Former North British Railway stations
Railway stations in Great Britain opened in 1855
Railway stations in Great Britain closed in 1962
1855 establishments in England
1962 disestablishments in England